"Ode on a Distant Prospect of Eton College" is an 18th-century ode by Thomas Gray. It is composed of ten 10-line stanzas, rhyming ABABCCDDED, with the B lines and final D line in iambic trimeter and the others in iambic tetrameter. In this poem, Gray coined the phrase "Ignorance is bliss". It occurs in the final stanza of the poem:

References

English poems